
Gmina Szastarka is a rural gmina (administrative district) in Kraśnik County, Lublin Voivodeship, in eastern Poland.

Villages
Gmina Szastarka contains the villages and settlements of Blinów Drugi, Blinów Pierwszy, Brzozówka, Brzozówka-Kolonia, Cieślanki, Huta Józefów, Majdan-Obleszcze, Polichna, Rzeczyca-Kolonia, Stare Moczydła, Szastarka, Wojciechów and Wojciechów-Kolonia.

Neighbouring gminas
Gmina Szastarka is bordered by the gminas of Batorz, Kraśnik, Modliborzyce, Potok Wielki, Trzydnik Duży and Zakrzówek.

References

Polish official population figures 2006

Szastarka
Kraśnik County